Ernesto Tamayo (18 September 1971 – 17 October 2014) was a Cuban classical guitarist who toured extensively throughout North and South America and Europe.

Biography 

Born in Havana, Cuba, Tamayo began studying the guitar with his father when he was five. He made his television debut at the age of nine.

In 1995, Sony Music Entertainment and Sony Classical of Mexico enabled Tamayo to come to the United States. He received a full scholarship for advanced studies at The Peabody Conservatory with world-renowned guitarist Manuel Barrueco. In Cuba, Tamayo studied with world-renowned composer and guitarist Leo Brouwer and Antonio Alberto Rodriguez.

Since he arrived in the United States, Tamayo has performed in numerous concert series and with orchestras in the United States and abroad. In September 1999, he made his Carnegie Hall debut with a sold-out performance. Past engagements at guitar festivals include appearances at the Fourth International Guitar Festival in Cuernavaca, Mexico, the Sixth International Guitar Festival in Long Island, New York, the "Classical Guitarists of the World" concert series in Fullerton, California and the Connecticut Guitar Summer Workshop. He has also given solo recitals at the Kennedy Center as well as for the classical guitar societies of Baltimore, Miami, Reno, Cheyenne, and Northern Colorado, among others.

The Cuban Guitarist album features two world premier recordings, The Havana Suite by Cuban guitarist and composer Aldo Rodriguez, and Five Inspirations composed by Tamayo himself. The Classical Persuasions album was released in September 2006. On it, Tamayo features works by Borges, Canonigos, Lauro, Weiss, Sor, Brouwer, Albeniz, Rodrigo, and Tarrega. Artistico was released on December 2, 2007.

Tamayo is a recipient of career development grants from the Maryland State Arts Council, the New York Foundation for the Arts, and the Bossak/Heilbron Foundation. He has been sponsored in the past by The Bacardi Foundation, Del Mar Foundation, La Bella Strings and performs and records with Thomas Humphrey, David Daily, and Stephan Connor guitars.

In 1997 Tamayo was appointed Chairman of the guitar department at The Pennsylvania Academy of Music in Lancaster, Pennsylvania. His students have been accepted into music schools such as the Peabody Conservatory in Baltimore, Maryland, and Indiana University in Bloomington, Indiana.

Ernesto Tamayo died on 17 October 2014 after a year-long battle with brain cancer.

Recordings 
 Ernesto Tamayo Plays Bach (1998)
 Melodias Cubanas (2000)
 The Cuban Guitarist (2005)
 Classical Persuasions (2006)
 Artistico (2007)
 El Poema de la Rosa (2010)

References

External links 
 Ernesto Tamayo (official web site)

Cuban classical guitarists
Cuban male guitarists
1971 births
2014 deaths
People from Havana
People from New Milford, Connecticut
Peabody Institute alumni
Musicians from Lancaster, Pennsylvania
Guitarists from Pennsylvania
American male guitarists
20th-century classical musicians
20th-century American male musicians